Michael Haydn's Symphony No. 37 in D major, Perger 29, Sherman 37, MH 476, written in Salzburg in 1788, is the last D major symphony he wrote, the fourth of his final set of six symphonies.

The symphony is scored for 2 oboes (2nd alternating on flute in the second movement), 2 bassoons, 2 horns and strings and is in three movements:

Vivace
Andantino, in A major
Allegro assai

The first movement is notable among Haydn's works for the use of tremolo notation as a shortcut for repeated semiquavers. The second movement, like the slow movements of other symphonies in the set, treats the woodwinds in an almost concertante fashion. The third movement is a lively rondo with a little development in minor keys of the A subject before the final restatement in D major. Though the bassoon is for the most part doubling the cellos, towards the end Haydn has them imitate the twirls of the first violins a bar after, lending a hint of wit redolent of Joseph Haydn's rondo finales.

References
 A. Delarte, "A Quick Overview Of The Instrumental Music Of Michael Haydn" Bob's Poetry Magazine November 2006: 30 - 31 PDF
 Charles H. Sherman and T. Donley Thomas, Johann Michael Haydn (1737 - 1806), a chronological thematic catalogue of his works. Stuyvesant, New York: Pendragon Press (1993)
 C. Sherman, "Johann Michael Haydn" in The Symphony: Salzburg, Part 2 London: Garland Publishing (1982): lxviii

External links 
 The complete symphony is available in the MIDI format from Classical Archives. It was at first put in Joseph Haydn's page after his No. 104, but now it is in the general H page as "Symphony in D, Perger29, Sherman37, MH476." The tempi of the first two movements in the MIDI match the Goritzki recording, but for the finale a noticeably slower interpretation of "Allegro assai" is taken.

Symphony 37
1788 compositions
Compositions in D major